Stenoptilia grandipuncta is a moth of the family Pterophoridae. It is found in Canada, including Manitoba.

References

Moths described in 1939
grandipuncta
Moths of North America